Harlem World is the debut album by American hip hop recording artist Mase, released on October 28, 1997, by Bad Boy Records and Arista Records. The album was nominated at the 41st Annual Grammy Awards for Best Rap Album. It went on to sell 4.9 million copies in the United States, going quadruple Platinum in the United States. Harlem World sold nearly 273,000 copies during its first week.

Background
Seen as Puff Daddy's new protégé since the passing of The Notorious B.I.G., Mase rose to fame after being a member of Children of the Corn with fellow Harlem rappers Big L and Cam'ron. After the death of Bloodshed and the subsequent disbanding of the group, Mase was signed to Bad Boy, catching the public eye when appearing on the track "Mo Money, Mo Problems" from Biggie's 1997 album Life After Death. Puff Daddy began to promote Mase as the new premier act of Bad Boy and within a year had released "Harlem World", a successful album spawning hits such as "Feel So Good" (U.S. #5), "What You Want" (U.S. #6), and "Lookin' at Me" (U.S. #8).

Mase released his first solo LP, Harlem World, which debuted at #1 on the Billboard Pop and R&B LP charts selling over 175,000 copies in the U.S. its first week of release; it has since gone on to sell 4.8 million copies in the United States. Joining Mase on his solo LP was a long list of rap elite including Jay-Z, Lil' Kim, Busta Rhymes, 8Ball & MJG, The Lox, Total, and his close friend DMX. The album featured production by Combs, Steven "Stevie J" Jordan, Jermaine Dupri, Ron "Amen-Ra" Lawrence Deric "D-Dot" Angelettie,  and (then unknowns) The Neptunes. Mase told MTV about his first solo effort: "Well, basically what I'm trying to establish is a strong identity and foundation for Mase so a lot of people could know that Mase is his own person and Mase can do other things besides rap and music and things in that nature."

Reception

Entertainment Weekly said of the album: "...creatively refreshing, well-crafted lyrics... rap's newest bad boy more than holds his own on his solo debut... his distinctive marble-mouthed drawl... creates a regular-guy persona all too rare in hip-hop."Muzik (4/9, p.84) - 4 stars (out of 5) - "...Harlem on the rise? Most definitely."
Rap Pages (1/98, p.105) - Solid Material - "...Creatively refreshing, well-crafted lyrics and a high-energy track over a hyped beat easily make this..."

In 2008, the single "Feel So Good" was ranked number 67 on VH1's 100 Greatest Songs of Hip Hop.

Track listing

Sample credits
 "Do You Wanna Get $" sampled "Do Ya Wanna Get Funky with Me" by Peter Brown.
 "Feel So Good" sampled "Hollywood Swinging" by Kool & The Gang and "Bad Boy" by Miami Sound Machine.
 "Love You So" sampled "Square Biz" by Teena Marie and "Ooh Boy" by Rose Royce.
 "Jealous Guy" sampled "Jealous Girl" by New Edition & by Another Bad Creation.
 "Will They Die 4 U?" sampled "Everything Good to You (Ain't Always Good for You)" by B.T. Express.
 "Puff's Intro" sampled "Joy" by Isaac Hayes.
 "Wanna Hurt Mase?" sampled "Do You Really Want to Hurt Me" by Culture Club.
 "I Need to Be" sampled "Tomorrow" by The Brothers Johnson.
 "24 Hrs. to Live" sampled "Moses Theme" by Frankie Bleu.
 "What You Want" sampled "Right on for the Darkness" by Curtis Mayfield.
 "Cheat on You" sampled "Don't Stop 'Til You Get Enough" by Michael Jackson.
 "Lookin' at Me" interpolated "Illegal Search" by LL Cool J.

Personnel

Barry White	 – 	Grooming
Eightball & MJG	 – 	Performer
Billy Lawrence	 – 	Performer
Busta Rhymes	 – 	Performer
Sean "Diddy" Combs	 – 	Producer, Mixing, Performer, Executive Producer
DMX	 – 	Performer
Jermaine Dupri	 – 	Producer, Mixing
Kelis     –     Performer
Ben Garrison	 – 	Engineer
Tony Maserati	 – 	Mixing
Michael Patterson	 – 	Engineer, Mixing
Herb Powers	 – 	Mastering
Phil Tan	 – 	Engineer, Mixing
Doug Wilson	 – 	Engineer
Total	 – 	Performer
Nasheim Myrick	 – 	Producer
Monifah	 – 	Performer
112	 – 	Performer
Jay–Z	 – 	Performer
Lil' Kim	 – 	Performer
Deric Angelettie	 – 	Producer, Associate Executive Producer
MJG	 – 	Performer
Prince Charles Alexander	 – 	Mixing
Carlos "6 July" Broady	 – 	Piano, Producer
Lisa Peardon	 – 	Photography
Kelly Price	 – 	Vocals
Lane Craven	 – 	Mixing
Groovy Lew	 – 	Stylist
Marcus Logan – Marketing
Mase	 – 	Rap
LOX	 – 	Performer
Pharrell Williams	 – 	Producer
Stephen Dent	 – 	Engineer
Jimmie Wilson	 – 	Engineer
Ron "Amen-Ra" Lawrence	 – 	Producer
J–Dub	 – 	Programming
Chad Hugo	 – 	Producer
Dame Grease	 – 	Producer
DJ DeVonte Luv	 – 	Scratching
Richard "Younglord" Frierson	 – 	Producer
Lil' Cease	 – 	Performer
Black Rob	 – 	Performer
Cudda Love– Manager
Kelly Mack– Road Manager
Supa Sam– Road DJ

Charts

Year-end charts

Certifications

See also
List of number-one albums of 1997 (U.S.)
List of number-one R&B albums of 1997 (U.S.)

References

1997 debut albums
Albums produced by Sean Combs
Albums produced by Dame Grease
Albums produced by Jermaine Dupri
Albums produced by the Neptunes
Bad Boy Records albums
Mase albums